Belorussky (masculine), Belorusskaya (feminine), or Belorusskoye (neuter) may refer to:
Belorussky Rail Terminal, a rail terminal in Moscow, Russia
Belorussky (settlement), a settlement in Pskov Oblast, Russia
Belorusskaya (Koltsevaya line), a station on the Koltsevaya line of the Moscow Metro, Moscow, Russia
Belorusskaya (Zamoskvoretskaya line), a station on the Zamoskvoretskaya line of the Moscow Metro, Moscow, Russia

See also
Belarusian (disambiguation)